Club Atlético Puerto Comercial is an Argentine football club based in the city of Bahía Blanca, in the Buenos Aires Province.

Honors

Liga del Sur: 1920, 1924, 1926, 1927, 1928, 1931, 1935, 1936, 1937, 1941, 1943, 1958, 1973, 1989.
Participation in the Torneo Nacional: 1974

External links
Magazine Planeta Verde y Amarillo´s official site.

Bahía Blanca
Puerto Comercial
Association football clubs established in 1915
1915 establishments in Argentina